In mathematics, the falling factorial (sometimes called the descending factorial, falling sequential product, or lower factorial) is defined as the polynomial

The rising factorial (sometimes called the Pochhammer function, Pochhammer polynomial, ascending factorial, rising sequential product, or upper factorial) is defined as

The value of each is taken to be 1 (an empty product) when  These symbols are collectively called factorial powers.

The Pochhammer symbol, introduced by Leo August Pochhammer, is the notation , where  is a non-negative integer. It may represent either the rising or the falling factorial, with different articles and authors using different conventions. Pochhammer himself actually used  with yet another meaning, namely to denote the binomial coefficient 

In this article, the symbol  is used to represent the falling factorial, and the symbol  is used for the rising factorial. These conventions are used in combinatorics,
In the theory of special functions (in particular the hypergeometric function) and in the standard reference work Abramowitz and Stegun, the Pochhammer symbol  is used to represent the rising factorial.
 
When  is a positive integer,  gives the number of -permutations (sequences of distinct elements) from an -element set, or equivalently the number of injective functions from a set of size  to a set of size ; while  gives the number of partitions of a -element set into  ordered sequences (possibly empty), or the number of ways to arrange  distinct flags on a row of  flagpoles.

Examples and combinatorial interpretation
The first few rising factorials are as follows:

The first few falling factorials are as follows:

The coefficients that appear in the expansions are Stirling numbers of the first kind.

When the variable  is a positive integer, the number  is equal to the number of -permutations from a set of  items, that is, the number of ways of choosing an ordered list of length  consisting of distinct elements drawn from a collection of size . For example,  is the number of different podiums—assignments of gold, silver, and bronze medals—possible in an eight-person race. Also,  is "the number of ways to arrange  flags on  flagpoles",
where all flags must be used and each flagpole can have at most one flag.

Properties

The rising and falling factorials are simply related to one another:

Rising and falling factorials of integers are directly related to the ordinary factorial:

Rising factorials of half integers are directly related to the double factorial:

The rising and falling factorials can be used to express a binomial coefficient:

Thus many identities on binomial coefficients carry over to the falling and rising factorials.

The rising and falling factorials are well defined in any unital ring, and therefore  can be taken to be, for example, a complex number, including negative integers, or a polynomial with complex coefficients, or any complex-valued function.

and so can the falling factorial:

Falling factorials appear in multiple differentiation of simple power functions:

provided that  Note, however, that the hypergeometric function literature typically uses the notation  for rising factorials.

Relation to umbral calculus
The falling factorial occurs in a formula which represents polynomials using the forward difference operator  and which is formally similar to Taylor's theorem:

 

A similar result holds for the rising factorial and the backward difference operator.

The study of analogies of this type is known as umbral calculus. A  general theory covering such relations, including the falling and rising factorial functions, is given by the theory of polynomial sequences of binomial type and Sheffer sequences. Rising and falling factorials are Sheffer sequences of binomial type, as shown by the relations:

where the coefficients are the same as those in the binomial theorem.

Similarly, the generating function of Pochhammer polynomials then amounts to the umbral exponential,

since

Connection coefficients and identities 
The falling and rising factorials are related to one another through the Lah numbers:

The following formulas relate integral powers of a variable  through sums using the Stirling numbers of the second kind, notated by curly brackets :

Since the falling factorials are a basis for the polynomial ring, one can express the product of two of them as a linear combination of falling factorials:

The coefficients  are called connection coefficients, and have a combinatorial interpretation as the number of ways to identify (or "glue together")  elements each from a set of size  and a set of size .

There is also a connection formula for the ratio of two rising factorials given by

Additionally, we can expand generalized exponent laws and negative rising and falling powers through the following identities:

Finally, duplication and multiplication formulas for the falling and rising factorials provide the next relations:

Alternative notations
An alternative notation for the rising factorial

and for the falling factorial

goes back to A. Capelli (1893) and L. Toscano (1939), respectively. Graham, Knuth, and Patashnik
propose to pronounce these expressions as " to the  rising" and " to the  falling", respectively.

(See permutation and combination.)

An alternative notation for the rising factorial  is the less common . When  is used to denote the rising factorial, the notation  is typically used for the ordinary falling factorial, to avoid confusion.

Generalizations
The Pochhammer symbol has a generalized version called the generalized Pochhammer symbol, used in multivariate analysis. There is also a -analogue, the -Pochhammer symbol.

A generalization of the falling factorial in which a function is evaluated on a descending arithmetic sequence of integers and the values are multiplied is:

The corresponding generalization of the rising factorial is

These coefficients satisfy a number of analogous properties to those for the Stirling numbers of the first kind as well as recurrence relations and functional equations related to the -harmonic numbers,

A symmetric generalization can be defined as

See also
Pochhammer -symbol
Vandermonde identity

References

External links
 
  — Elementary proofs

Gamma and related functions
Factorial and binomial topics
Finite differences
Operations on numbers